Jeff Global's Global Probe is a short-lived regional comedy sketch show first seen on ITV Wales in 2004.

Shown exclusively in Wales, the show was intended as a follow-up to the popular Barry Welsh is Coming, which had concluded in 2004 with the sacking of the geeky Barry Welsh (John Sparkes) as presenter (and subsequent rehiring as a lavatory attendant). The show is replaced by a clip-based review of cable television hosted by the more competent Jeff Global (also played by Sparkes).

Jeff was, according to Sparkes, "smart, strong, attractive...basically, everything Barry isn't". New characters and segments were introduced including The Rectifiers (a Midlands-based parody of the 60s espionage/sci-fi series, The Champions), Eddie Giraffe (a short but tough New York cop) and Jay Clough (a series of badly edited crime drams from the 1950s). Hugh Pugh and Mr. Ffff were brought over from the original Barry Welsh series.

The series' supporting cast consisted of former Barry Welsh is Coming cast members Kim Wall, Gordon Kennedy & Felicity Montagu, actress Harriet Halfhead and singer & television presenter Emma Walford.

Only two episodes of the six-part series were broadcast in March 2004 with the remaining four episodes shown in August 2004. The programme was not recommissioned for a second series.

2000s Welsh television series
2004 British television series debuts
2004 British television series endings
ITV sketch shows
ITV comedy
Welsh television shows